Michaël Bosqui (born 2 February 1990 in Fos-sur-Mer) is a French-born Mauritian professional footballer who plays for Championnat National side CA Bastia.

Career

Senior career
He began his career in the team of his city Etoile Sportive Fosséenne in season 2010-2011.

In the 2012 Summer, Bosqui moved to FC Istres in Ligue 2.

In February 2015, Bosqui moved to CA Bastia.

International career
Justin has called up to play for Mauritius in 2016.

References

1990 births
Living people
Mauritian footballers
French footballers
French people of Mauritian descent
Ligue 2 players
Championnat National players
FC Istres players
Mauritius international footballers
Association football defenders